The Authority is a superhero comic book series published by DC Comics under the Wildstorm imprint. It was created in 1999 by Warren Ellis and Bryan Hitch, and follows the adventures of the Authority, a superhero team mainly composed of Ellis-created characters from Stormwatch.

A film centered on the team is in development at DC Studios.

Publication history

Volume 1

Ellis/Hitch run
In 1999, Warren Ellis and Bryan Hitch created the Authority, a team of superheroes who got the job done by any means necessary. The original line-up consisted of Jenny Sparks, a British woman who could generate and turn into electricity; Jack Hawksmoor, who was psychically bonded to cities in order to communicate with them and receive powers from them; Swift, a Tibetan woman who possessed wings and sharp talons; Apollo, a bio-engineered Superman pastiche; Midnighter, a bio-engineered Batman pastiche who possessed the ability to foresee his opponents' moves in combat; The Engineer, a scientist who had replaced her blood with nine pints of nanotechnology and could create solid objects with it; and The Doctor, a Dutch drug addict and shaman who possessed the combined powers of the hundreds of shamans who came before him. On the creation of the series, Ellis noted:

The Ellis/Hitch run of The Authority lasted 12 issues, divided into three four-issue story arcs: The Circle, Shiftships, and Outer Dark. Outer Dark ended with team leader Jenny Sparks, thought to be the Spirit of the 20th Century, dying in the final minutes of December 31, 1999, as, in the public consciousness at least, the 20th Century ended and the 21st began.

Millar/Quitely run

Replacing Ellis and Hitch after issue #12 were writer Mark Millar and artist Frank Quitely. Tom Peyer and Dustin Nguyen worked on a four-issue fill-in arc, and Arthur Adams drew the final three issues of Millar's run.

During the Millar/Quitely run, the Authority was now under Jack Hawksmoor's leadership following Jenny Sparks' death at the end of the 20th century. They faced multiple foes such as a mad scientist and his army of superhumans who wanted to influence the 21st Century through Jenny Sparks' successor Jenny Quantum, a previous Doctor who manipulated the Earth itself, and a duplicate team of superheroes modeled on the Authority that was created and backed by the G7 group of nations. Also during the run, Jenny Quantum was adopted by Apollo and Midnighter after they were married and the Doctor worked through his heroin addiction after faltering in battle.

A number of panels and covers during the Millar/Quitely run, which was published in the aftermath of the September 11 attacks, were censored by DC Comics. During Millar and Quitely's first arc, red filters were used to obscure particularly violent panels. DC also ordered a scene in which Apollo and Midnighter kiss be completely removed, and a character based on Marvel Comics' Captain America be redesigned, subsequently re-drawn and recolored on the cover to issue #14 to differentiate between the two. DC would order Adams' work on the final issues of the volume be substantially re-drawn, the more significant examples being a scene depicting leader of the G7 Authority, The Colonel, about to perform a sexual act on Jenny Sparks' severely-decomposed corpse that was re-drawn and Millar's dialogue was re-written to remove any depiction or mention of necrophilia; a panel in which G7 Authority member Teuton kills multiple people by flying through them, that was re-drawn as two separate and less graphic panels; multiple panels in which Teuton gropes Apollo against his will and is then killed in a particularly gory fashion, which were re-drawn so as not to show the groping and to make Teuton's death scene less explicit; a series of panels depicting Swift being humiliated, which had sexual overtones, and was re-drawn so as to soften the scene; and a panel in which George W. Bush was depicted that was re-drawn so the character who appears as the President of the United States would not resemble Bush.

The team's unilateral interventionism would go on to be compared to the U.S.-led coalition's intervention in Iraq.

Volume 2
The series was subsequently restarted, (with a planned "Mature Readers" relaunch by Brian Azzarello and Glenn Fabry being scrapped in the wake of 9/11), and was written by Robbie Morrison with art by Dwayne Turner (except for the single issue "Behemoth", which featured art by Tan Eng Huat, and "Street Life", which was penciled by Whilce Portacio). This incarnation of the series lasted for 15 issues, including issues 1-14 and the series of back-ups that ran through Stormwatch: Team Achilles #9, Sleeper #3 and Wildcats 3.0 #8 which were eventually published as issue 0. Prior to issue 10, the series was part of the "Coup d'état" crossover that included The Authority, Stormwatch: Team Achilles, Sleeper, and Wildcats v3.0. The crossover revolved around the Authority taking over the United States of America.

Revolution
The series was again restarted in October 2004 as The Authority: Revolution, a twelve issue mini-series written by Ed Brubaker and drawn by Dustin Nguyen and Richard Friend that focused on the troubles the Authority faced as the rulers of America.

Volume 3

Morrison/Ha run
 In February 2006, it was announced that Grant Morrison would write The Authority Volume 3, with art by Gene Ha. The series was intended to be published bimonthly, beginning in October 2006. Morrison "cited Warren Ellis’s original run as an approach they wanted to return to, saying their new approach will allow the team to be effectual again".

Morrison and Ha's first issue was released in December 2006. It followed a family man named Ken in his search for a downed submarine that encountered something massive and unexpected in the depths of the ocean that caused it to be destroyed. When Ken finds the ship, many of the crew are missing. The issue ends as Ken and his search party encounters the Authority's Carrier, 50 miles long, lying on the ocean floor.

The second issue came out five months after the first and dealt with the Authority's reaction to crash-landing on a less developed Earth than theirs. Ken meets The Authority but begins to question their methodology.

In September 2007, Gene Ha was quoted at Newsarama as saying that he did not believe his run with Morrison would continue.  "...I don't think The Authority #3 by Grant Morrison and Gene Ha is ever coming out. Grant is busy redesigning the DC Universe and I've moved onto new projects. Most importantly, it seems that editor Scott Dunbier has been forced out of Wildstorm. There is no #3 script, there may never be a #3 script."

Scott Peterson announced at Wondercon 2008 that he had talked to Morrison two weeks earlier about The Authority, and there was "very serious progress" and it would start shipping again toward the end of the year. When asked to comment upon their inability to complete further issues of The Authority, Morrison has said '"Authority was just a disaster." They said that they were doing it and running late when 52 started, but when they saw the reviews to the first issue, "I said fuck it."'

The Lost Year
On 19 April 2008, Wildstorm announced Keith Giffen would complete Grant Morrison's scripts. Giffen ran into an immediate problem: "I stepped into a book that was in the midst of a type of storyline that is probably my least favorite in comics. And that is, heroes come to our earth". However, according to Giffen, this was only the first short arc of the longer story:

The remaining issues of volume 3 were published by Wildstorm under the title The Authority: The Lost Year. Giffen was credited alongside Morrison as the writer, with several artists contributing. Eventually, J. M. DeMatteis joined the creative team for a few issues as co-writer. The series ran a total of twelve issues, including the original two by Morrison.

Prime
In July 2007, it was announced that Christos Gage and Darick Robertson would do an intended storyarc as a miniseries due to the scheduling problems with the Morrison/Ha run on the title. The resulting six-issue miniseries entitled The Authority: Prime was planned to have spanned issues #6 to #11 of The Authority (vol. 3). It featured the renewed Stormwatch Prime who, along with the Authority, investigate a recently discovered secret bunker that once belonged to Henry Bendix.

Volume 4

Abnett/Lanning/Coleby era

Dan Abnett and Andy Lanning relaunched the book in May 2008 in the wake of the World's End event and took over the writing duties, accompanied by artist Simon Coleby, writing the first seventeen issues of the series. Senior Wildstorm editor Ben Abernathy also said of four issues that had already been completed by the new team, "I can say honestly, based on the four issues of script and art that are already in the can, people will NOT be disappointed!"

Abnett and Lanning's contract with Marvel Comics included a clause which allowed them to finish their existing projects, including their run on The Authority.

Bernardin/Freeman/Barrionuevo era
Writers Marc Bernardin & Adam Freeman and artist Al Barrionuevo worked on the book for a four-issue run from #18 to #21, including the epilogue in issue 17.

Taylor/Barrionuevo era
Writer Tom Taylor (writer of several Star Wars titles including the Star Wars: Invasion series) took over The Authority with issue #22, (with artist Mike S. Miller filling in for two issues for Al Barrinuevo), until the series concluded with #29.

Storylines

Members
The founding members of the Authority were:
Jenny Sparks, "The Spirit of the Twentieth Century"; the group's founder and original leader.
Apollo, "The Sun God".
Midnighter a.k.a. Lucas Trent, "Night's Bringer of War".
The Doctor a.k.a. Jeroen Thornedike, "The Shaman".
The second Engineer a.k.a. Angela Spica, "The Maker".
Jack Hawksmoor, "The God of Cities"; leader of the Authority from 2000 to 2005, and again from 2008 to 2010.
Swift a.k.a. Shen Li-Min, "The Winged Huntress".

Following the Outer Dark story arc, Jenny Sparks was replaced with:
Jenny Quantum, "The Spirit of the 21st Century"; leader of the Authority from 2005 to 2008.

At the end of the Revolution maxi-series, the Authority gained two new members:
The Doctor a.k.a. Habib ben Hassan, "The Shaman"; Thornedike's successor and
Rose Tattoo, "The Spirit of Life"; formerly "The Spirit of Murder", the personification of the act of murder, and seemingly capable of killing anyone; member of Stormwatch.

Beginning with #18 of volume four the team roster underwent a major change. Jack Hawksmoor, Swift and Engineer remained on the team, where they were joined by new members:
Synergy a.k.a. Christine Trelane; formerly Stormwatch's activator, capable of activating or temporarily removing Seedlings' powers; their second Weatherman until Henry Bendix's return; and second-in-command under Jackson King.
Deathblow a.k.a. Michael Cray; former member of Team 7.
Flint a.k.a. Victoria Ngengi; former member of Stormwatch.
Freefall a.k.a. Roxanne Spaulding; former member of Gen 13.
Grifter a.k.a. Cole Cash; former member of the Wildcats and Team 7.
The High a.k.a. John Cumberland; one of the first super-heroes active in America during the 1930s and '40s, long thought to be an urban legend, and former member of the radical super-human group The Changers.
Rainmaker a.k.a. Sarah Rainmaker; former member of Gen 13.

The Authority's base of operations is the Carrier, a sentient, gigantic, interdimensional "shiftship" existing everywhere on Earth at the same time and capable of moving through every imaginable plane of existence.

Awards
The series was nominated for "Outstanding Comic Book" in the 14th and 15th GLAAD Media Awards.

Collected editions

In other media
A film centered on the Authority was announced to be in development at DC Studios in January 2023.

See also
 Nextwave

References

External links

The Authority: The Continuity Pages
Censorship of The Authority | Sequart Research & Literacy Organization — article on Millar's run being censored

Characters created by Bryan Hitch
Comics by Mark Millar
Comics by Warren Ellis
LGBT-related comics
Widescreen comics
WildStorm superhero teams
WildStorm titles